Jrue Randall Holiday (born June 12, 1990) is an American professional basketball player for the Milwaukee Bucks of the National Basketball Association (NBA). He played college basketball for one season with the UCLA Bruins before being selected by the Philadelphia 76ers in the first round of the 2009 NBA draft with the 17th overall pick. Holiday played four seasons with Philadelphia before being traded to the New Orleans Pelicans in 2013. He is a two-time NBA All-Star and four-time NBA All-Defensive Team member. Known as one of the league's best defenders, he helped lead the Milwaukee Bucks to an NBA championship in 2021 and won a gold medal with the 2020 U.S. Olympic team.

High school career
Holiday was born to Shawn and Toya (née DeCree) Holiday. His parents both played college basketball at Arizona State, where Toya was named Pac-10 Player of the Year in 1982. Holiday attended Campbell Hall School in the Los Angeles district of Studio City, California. As a senior, he averaged 25.9 points, 11.2 rebounds, 6.9 assists, 4.8 steals per game. The team went 31–5 and won the California Division IV state title. Holiday was rated the No. 1 point guard and the No. 2 overall prospect in the Class of 2008 by Rivals.com. He was named the 2008 Gatorade National Player of the Year and a Parade first-team All-American. He also played in the McDonald's All-American Game, tallying 14 points, 5 rebounds, 3 assists and 5 steals.

College career
In 2008–09, Holiday played alongside fellow future NBA player Darren Collison in the backcourt at UCLA. In 35 games (all starts), Holiday averaged 8.5 points, 3.8 rebounds, 3.7 assists and 1.6 steals in 27.1 minutes per game. He shot 45.0% from the floor, 30.7% from 3-point range and 72.6% from the line, earning Pac-10 All-Freshman Team honors. He scored a career-high 20 points on a perfect 8-of-8 shooting in just 19 minutes of play against Florida International. He had 13 points and six assists in UCLA's one-point win over Virginia Commonwealth in the first round of the NCAA tournament. After the season, he declared for the NBA draft, forgoing his final three years of college eligibility.

Professional career

Philadelphia 76ers (2009–2013)

Holiday was drafted 17th overall by the Philadelphia 76ers in the 2009 NBA draft. On April 3, 2010, he scored a season-high 25 points against the Toronto Raptors. On November 5, 2010, he set a new career high with 29 points against the Cleveland Cavaliers. On February 2, 2011, he recorded his first career triple-double with 11 points, 10 rebounds and 11 assists against the New Jersey Nets. On March 17, 2012, he set a new career high with 30 points against the Chicago Bulls. On November 25, 2012, he set a new career high with 33 points against the Phoenix Suns. On January 2, 2013, he recorded his second career triple-double with 16 points, 10 rebounds and 10 assists against the Suns. On January 18, 2013, he matched his career high with 33 points against the Toronto Raptors. On January 26, 2013, he scored a career-high 35 points against the New York Knicks. Two days earlier, he was selected as a reserve for the Eastern Conference All-Star team for the 2013 NBA All-Star Game. With his first All-Star selection, the 22-year-old Holiday became the youngest player in franchise history to be named an All-Star.

New Orleans Pelicans (2013–2020)
On July 12, 2013, Holiday was traded to the New Orleans Pelicans in exchange for Nerlens Noel and the Pelicans' 2014 first-round draft pick. His 2013–14 season ended prematurely after season-ending surgery in February 2014 for a stress fracture in his right tibia. He had not played since January 8 because of the shin injury. In 34 games, he averaged 14.3 points, 7.9 assists and 1.6 steals per game.

On January 5, 2015, against the Washington Wizards, Holiday reached 5,000 career points. On February 18, he was ruled out for three weeks after aggravating an already injured lower right leg. He returned to action much later than originally expected, coming off the bench against the Phoenix Suns on April 10 after missing 41 games.

On March 9, 2016, Holiday scored a career-high 38 points against the Charlotte Hornets. On March 29, he was ruled out for the rest of the season after being diagnosed with a right interior orbital wall fracture.

On November 18, 2016, Holiday made his season debut after missing the Pelicans' first 12 games while on a leave of absence to care for his wife. In 23 minutes off the bench, he scored 21 points on 8-of-14 shooting in a 113–101 win over the Portland Trail Blazers. On January 23, 2017, he had 33 points and 10 assists in a 124–122 win over the Cleveland Cavaliers.

On July 6, 2017, Holiday re-signed with the Pelicans. On November 9, he had a season-high 34 points and 11 assists in a 122–118 loss to the Toronto Raptors. On December 4, he scored 34 points in a 125–115 loss to the Golden State Warriors. On December 10, he made five 3-pointers in the fourth quarter, when he scored 19 of his 34 points, helping the Pelicans defeat the Philadelphia 76ers 131–124. A day later, he had a season-high 37 points in a 130–123 loss to the Houston Rockets. On February 25, 2018, he scored 28 of his 36 points after halftime to lead the Pelicans to a 123–121 overtime victory over the Milwaukee Bucks. On March 6, he recorded 19 points and 17 assists in a 121–116 win over the Los Angeles Clippers. On March 27, he had 21 points, 11 assists and 11 rebounds in a 107–103 loss to the Portland Trail Blazers. In Game 2 of the Pelicans' first-round playoff series against the Trail Blazers, Holiday had a career playoff-high 33 points in helping New Orleans take a 2–0 series lead with a 111–102 win. In Game 4, Holiday scored 41 points as the Pelicans completed a first-round sweep of the Trail Blazers with a 131–123 victory. The Pelicans went on to lose in five games to the Warriors in the second round, with Holiday recording 27 points, 10 rebounds and 11 assists in a 113–104 loss in Game 5.

On November 7, 2018, Holiday had 17 points, 10 rebounds and nine assists in a 107–98 win over the Chicago Bulls. He eclipsed 2,000 career assists with his fifth of the game. On November 12, he had 29 points and matched a season high with 14 assists in a 126–110 win over the Raptors. On December 3, he had season highs of 32 points and 14 assists in a 129–126 loss to the Clippers. On December 9, he scored 37 points in a 116–108 win over the Detroit Pistons. On January 29, he had 19 points, eight assists, six rebounds and a career-high six blocks in a 121–116 win over the Rockets, becoming the first guard in NBA history with at least 17 points, six rebounds, seven assists and six blocks in a game. On March 26, he underwent season-ending surgery to repair a core muscle injury.

On December 28, 2019, against Indiana, he and brothers Justin and Aaron of the Pacers became the first trio of brothers to share an NBA court simultaneously. On March 8, 2020, Holiday scored a season-high 37 points, to go with nine rebounds and eight assists in a 120–107 win over the Minnesota Timberwolves.

Milwaukee Bucks (2020–present)

2020–21 season: Championship and NBA Sportsmanship Award 
On November 24, 2020, Holiday was traded to the Milwaukee Bucks in a four-team trade, involving the Denver Nuggets and Oklahoma City Thunder, in which the Pelicans acquired Eric Bledsoe, Steven Adams and draft compensation. On March 4, 2021, Holiday scored 15 points in 23 minutes, and hit a game-winning 11 foot jump shot in a game against the Memphis Grizzlies. On April 3, Holiday scored a season-high 33 points on 14-of-23 shooting with seven rebounds and 11 assists in a win over the Kings. The following day, he agreed to a four-year contract extension with the Bucks, worth up to $160 million. Holiday had an option for the 2021–22 season worth $26 million. On his way to an NBA First Team All Defense selection, Holiday averaged a team-high 1.63 steals per game for the Bucks, which was fifth-best in the league. He also made multiple steals in 32 games, which was the second-most of any player in the league over the season.

On May 24, 2021, Holiday recorded a postseason career-high 15 assists, alongside 11 points and 7 rebounds, in a 132–98 Game 2 win against the Miami Heat in their first round playoff series. The Bucks eventually won the series 4–0.
In Game 6 of the Conference Finals against the Atlanta Hawks, Holiday dropped 27 points, nine rebounds, and nine assists in a 118–107 win, leading the Bucks to the NBA Finals for the first time since 1974. In Game 5 of the NBA Finals against the Phoenix Suns, Holiday put up 27 points, 4 rebounds, 13 assists, and recorded a critical steal from Devin Booker, which led to an alley oop to Giannis Antetokounmpo with less than 20 seconds left in the fourth quarter to help the Bucks win 123–119. In Game 6, Holiday recorded 12 points, 9 rebounds and 11 assists, to help Milwaukee to a 105–98 victory, closing out the Suns 4–2, securing the 2021 NBA title for the Bucks and awarding Holiday his first championship.

2021–22 season: Second NBA Teammate of the Year Award 

In October 2021, Holiday missed 6 games due to an ankle injury. On December 15, 2021, Holiday scored 26 points and recorded 14 assists in a victory over the Indiana Pacers in which Milwaukee was missing its other two "big three" members Giannis Antetokounmpo and Khris Middleton. On December 17, Holiday scored a career-high 40 points, grabbed 5 rebounds, and delivered 5 assists along with 2 steals in a 116–112 overtime loss against his former team the New Orleans Pelicans. On March 2, 2022, Holiday banked in a driving layup with 1.9 seconds left and the Milwaukee Bucks rallied from a 14-point deficit in the final six minutes to beat the Miami Heat 120–119. He finished the game with 25 points, 6 rebounds, 11 assists and 2 steals. The following game, Holiday scored 16 of his 26 points in the fourth quarter (10 in the final 5 minutes) along with 8 rebounds and 5 assists in a 118–112 win over the Chicago Bulls. On March 31, Holiday recorded a season-high 6 steals, along with scoring 18 points and grabbing a season-high 8 rebounds, in a 120–119 overtime win against the Brooklyn Nets.

On April 24, during Game 4 of the first round of the playoffs, Holiday posted 26 points and 7 assists in a 119–95 win over the Bulls. On May 7, in Game 3 of the Eastern Conference Semifinals, he scored 25 points including the game-winner in a 103–101 win over the Boston Celtics. In Game 5, Holiday stopped Marcus Smart on the Celtics' last two plays, recording a block and a steal to preserve the Bucks' lead in their comeback win, overcoming a 14-point, fourth-quarter deficit. Holiday finished with 24 points, eight rebounds and eight assists. However, the Bucks would go on to lose to Celtics in Game 7 despite Holiday’s 21-point, 5-rebound, 8-assist and 2-steal outing.

2022–23 season: Second All-Star Selection 
On October 31, 2022, Holiday scored 25 points (including a game-securing step-back three point shot with 45 seconds left), recorded 10 assists, and grabbed 7 rebounds, while leading the Bucks to a 110–108 win over the Detroit Pistons. On January 16, 2023, Holiday scored a then season-high 35 points and delivered 11 assists on 13-of-19 shooting, 5-of-8 from three and 4-of-4 from the free throw line in a 132–119 win over the Indiana Pacers.  The next game, Holiday upped his season-high to 37 points, along with 6 rebounds, 7 assists and 2 steals in a 130–122 win over the Toronto Raptors. In both games, Milwaukee was missing its other two "big three" members, Giannis Antetokounmpo and Khris Middleton. On January 23, Holiday was named the NBA Eastern Conference Player of the Week for Week 14 (January 16 – January 22), his second career NBA Player of the Week award. He led the Bucks to 2–1 week with averages of 33.3 points, 9.3 assists, 4.7 rebounds and 1.7 steals per game while shooting 56.9% from the field and 47.8% from three. On February 2, Holiday was named to the 2023 NBA All-Star Game as a reserve guard for the Eastern Conference for the first time in 10 seasons, the longest gap between selections for any player in NBA history. On February 14, Holiday tied a career-high 40 points, with a career-high eight three-point shots made, during a 131–125 overtime win against the Boston Celtics.

Career statistics

NBA

Regular season

|-
| style="text-align:left;"| 
| style="text-align:left;"| Philadelphia
| 73 || 51 || 24.2 || .442 || .390 || .756 || 2.6 || 3.8 || 1.1 || .2 || 8.0
|-
| style="text-align:left;"| 
| style="text-align:left;"| Philadelphia
| 82 || 82 || 35.4 || .446 || .365 || .823 || 4.0 || 6.5 || 1.5 || .4 || 14.0
|-
| style="text-align:left;"| 
| style="text-align:left;"| Philadelphia
| 65 || 65 || 33.8 || .432 || .380 || .783 || 3.3 || 4.5 || 1.6 || .3 || 13.5
|-
| style="text-align:left;"| 
| style="text-align:left;"| Philadelphia
| 78 || 78 || 37.5 || .431 || .368 || .752 || 4.2 || 8.0 || 1.6 || .4 || 17.7
|-
| style="text-align:left;"| 
| style="text-align:left;"| New Orleans
| 34 || 34 || 33.6 || .447 || .390 || .810 || 4.2 || 7.9 || 1.6 || .4 || 14.3
|-
| style="text-align:left;"| 
| style="text-align:left;"| New Orleans
| 40 || 37 || 32.6 || .446 || .378 || .855 || 3.4 || 6.9 || 1.6 || .6 || 14.8
|-
| style="text-align:left;"| 
| style="text-align:left;"| New Orleans
| 65 || 23 || 28.2 || .439 || .336 || .843 || 3.0 || 6.0 || 1.4 || .3 || 16.8
|-
| style="text-align:left;"| 
| style="text-align:left;"| New Orleans
| 67 || 61 || 32.7 || .453 || .356 || .708 || 3.9 || 7.3 || 1.5 || .6 || 15.4
|-
| style="text-align:left;"| 
| style="text-align:left;"| New Orleans
| 81 || 81 || 36.1 || .494 || .337 || .786 || 4.5 || 6.0 || 1.5 || .8 || 19.0
|-
| style="text-align:left;"| 
| style="text-align:left;"| New Orleans
| 67 || 67 || 35.9 || .472 || .325 || .768 || 5.0 || 7.7 || 1.6 || .8 || 21.2
|-
| style="text-align:left;"| 
| style="text-align:left;"| New Orleans
| 61 || 61 || 34.7 || .455 || .353 || .709 || 4.8 || 6.7 || 1.6 || .8 || 19.1
|-
| style="text-align:left;background:#afe6ba;"|†
| style="text-align:left;"| Milwaukee
| 59 || 56 || 32.3 || .503 || .392 || .787 || 4.5 || 6.1 || 1.6 || .6 || 17.7
|-
| style="text-align:left;"|
| style="text-align:left;"| Milwaukee
| 67 || 64 || 32.9 || .501 || .411 || .761 || 4.5 || 6.8 || 1.6 || .4 || 18.3
|- class="sortbottom"
| style="text-align:center;" colspan="2"| Career
| 839 || 760 || 33.2 || .460 || .363 || .776 || 4.0 || 6.4 || 1.5 || .5 || 16.2
|- class="sortbottom"
| style="text-align:center;" colspan="2"| All-Star
| 2 || 0 || 12.2 || .444 || .200 || – || 1.0 || 1.5 || 1.0 || .0 || 4.5

Playoffs

|-
| style="text-align:left;"| 2011
| style="text-align:left;"| Philadelphia
| 5 || 5 || 37.6 || .414 || .524 || .800 || 3.8 || 5.6 || 2.0 || .4 || 14.2
|-
| style="text-align:left;"| 2012
| style="text-align:left;"| Philadelphia
| 13 || 13 || 38.0 || .413 || .408 || .864 || 4.7 || 5.2 || 1.5 || .6 || 15.8
|-
| style="text-align:left;"| 2015
| style="text-align:left;"| New Orleans
| 3 || 0 || 18.3 || .368 || .250 || 1.000 || 1.0 || 4.3 || .7 || .3 || 6.3
|-
| style="text-align:left;"| 2018
| style="text-align:left;"| New Orleans
| 9 || 9 || 38.7 || .518 || .320 || .700 || 5.7 || 6.3 || 1.1 || .6 || 23.7
|-
|style="text-align:left;background:#afe6ba;"| 2021†
| style="text-align:left;"| Milwaukee
| style="background:#cfecec;"|  23* || style="background:#cfecec;"|  23* || 39.7 || .406 || .303 || .714 || 5.7 || 8.7 || 1.7 || .4 || 17.3
|-
| style="text-align:left;"| 2022
| style="text-align:left;"| Milwaukee
| 12 || 12 || 38.6 || .379 || .316 || .839 || 5.6 || 6.5 || 1.8 || .6 || 19.1
|- class="sortbottom"
| style="text-align:center;" colspan="2"| Career
| 65 || 62 || 37.8 || .419 || .336 || .783 || 5.1 || 6.8 || 1.6 || .5 || 17.5

College

|-
| style="text-align:left;"| 2008–09
| style="text-align:left;"| UCLA
| 35 || 35 || 27.1 || .450 || .307 || .726 || 3.8 || 3.7 || 1.6 || .5 || 8.5

Personal life

Both of Holiday's brothers, Justin and Aaron are also NBA players. His younger sister, Lauren, played college basketball on the UCLA women's team.

In July 2013, Holiday married United States women's national soccer team midfielder Lauren Cheney. The two first met at a UCLA women's basketball game during his only season at the school. While he was approaching his seat, a young girl asked if he was Darren Collison and asked for his autograph. After explaining that he was not Collison and preparing to take his seat, Cheney, who was seated behind him, said, "Don't worry, you're cuter than Darren is." At the time, both were in relationships with others, but they became friends, and began dating after he was drafted by the Sixers. They later began hosting annual combo basketball and soccer clinics at UCLA.

In September 2016, Holiday took indefinite leave from the Pelicans to care for his wife after she was diagnosed with a brain tumor. The following month, Lauren had brain surgery only weeks after giving birth to the couple's daughter, J.T. (Jrue Tyler). Holiday and his wife Lauren had their second child, a boy named Hendrix, in late 2020.

Holiday is a Christian. Holiday has said, “I'm a Christian athlete who has faith in Jesus Christ. So when I encounter circumstances over which I have no control, I believe and have peace.”

See also 
 List of National Basketball Association career assists leaders

References

External links

UCLA Bruins bio

1990 births
Living people
African-American basketball players
American men's basketball players
Basketball players at the 2020 Summer Olympics
Basketball players from Los Angeles
McDonald's High School All-Americans
Medalists at the 2020 Summer Olympics
Milwaukee Bucks players
National Basketball Association All-Stars
New Orleans Pelicans players
Olympic gold medalists for the United States in basketball
Parade High School All-Americans (boys' basketball)
People from Chatsworth, Los Angeles
Philadelphia 76ers draft picks
Philadelphia 76ers players
Point guards
UCLA Bruins men's basketball players
United States men's national basketball team players
21st-century African-American sportspeople